James Coutts or Jim Coutts may refer to:

 Jim Coutts (1938–2013), Canadian lawyer, businessman, and former advisor to two Prime Ministers
 James Coutts (footballer) (born 1987), English professional footballer
 James Coutts (MP) (1733–1778), Member of Parliament for Edinburgh, 1762–68

See also